Stone Academy may refer to:

Stone Academy (Connecticut), a vocational school with several branches
Stone Academy (Chicago), Illinois
Stone Academy (Solon, Iowa), a historic schoolhouse listed on the National Register of Historic Places